Bob Day (born 1952) is a politician and businessman in South Australia, Australia.

Bob Day may also refer to:

Bob Day (athlete) (1944–2012), American long-distance runner
Bob Day, character in New Girl
Bob Day (musician) (1941–2013), British musician in The Allisons

See also
Robert Day (disambiguation)